Bitter Sweet & Twisted is rock band the Quireboys's second studio album, released in 1993. The album was released on EMI and went into the UK Albums Chart at #31.

Three of the tracks from this album ("Tramps & Thieves", "Brother Louie" and "Last Time") were released as singles, the latter of which was only released in Japan. "Brother Louie" was the highest charting from this album, as it reached #32 on the UK Singles Chart.

The album was produced mostly by Bob Rock, some of the tracks were produced by the Rolling Stones producer Chris Kimsey. After this album, the Quireboys would split up and didn't release another studio album until 2001.

Track listing
 "Tramps and Thieves"
 "White Trash Blues"
 "Can't Park Here"
 "King of New York"
 "Don't Bite the Hand"
 "Last Time"
 "Debbie"
 "Brother Louie"
 "Ode to You (Baby Just Walk)"
 "Hates to Please"
 "My Saint Jude"
 "Take No Revenge"
 "Wild, Wild, Wild"
 "Ain't Love Blind"

Japanese bonus
 "Hey you (Live)"
 "Sweet Mary Ann (Live)"
 "Tramps & thieves (Live)"

Charts

Band
Spike - vocals, harp and guitar
Guy Bailey - guitar, mandolin and vocals
Guy Griffin - guitar, sitar and vocals
Nigel Mogg - bass and vocals
Rudy Richman - drums and percussion
Chris Johnstone - piano, Hammond B3 and clavinet

Additional musician 
 Bob Buckley - string arrangement

Singles 
 Tramps and Thieves (1992) UK #41
 Brother Louie (1993) UK #32
 Last Time (1993) Japan only release

References 

1993 albums
The Quireboys albums
Albums produced by Chris Kimsey
EMI Records albums